Douglas is a town in Southern Worcester County, Massachusetts. The population was 8,983 at the 2020 census. It includes the sizable Douglas State Forest, managed by the Department of Conservation and Recreation (DCR).

History 

The name of Douglas was first given to the territory of the town in the year 1746. New Sherborn or "New Sherborn Grant" had previously been its designation, since its first occupancy by the English settlers which was as early as 1715. The first English settlers came primarily from Sherborn, although many hailed from Natick as well. New Sherburn was removed from Suffolk County (or Middlesex county?) to Worcester County at its formation on April 2, 1731. It is said that there were subsequent pledges made by Dr. Douglas in the form of a bell for the Center School and 50 sterling pounds for seven years to support the ministry but quite a portion of these pledges were not received by the Town. 

Douglas's forests gave rise to a woodcutting industry and the Douglas axe company. A woolen manufacturing company, on the Mumford River in East Douglas, in recent times held by the Schuster family, has been prominent in the history of this community. General Lafayette, of France, stopped here during the Revolutionary War, to change horses, on his way to Boston to join General Washington. Lafayette was a hero of the American Revolution and the French Revolution.

From a very early period reaching beyond 1635, bands of Native Americans, principally the Nipmuc tribe, dominated this region of Worcester County. The Blackstone River was once called the Nipmuc River. Most of Douglas is part of the Blackstone River Valley National Heritage Corridor.

The underlying geology consists of rocks rich in quartz, feldspar, and mica. Boulders are plentifully scattered all over town, and gold and silver ores are said to be found in some localities. Large quantities of building and ornamental stone are quarried from the granite ledges found in the center of town which is shipped to almost every section of New England.

In 1946, as part of the town's bicentennial anniversary celebration and to welcome home for the troops returning from World War II, Winfield A. Schuster arranged an exhibition game between the Boston Red Sox and the New York Yankees that was played at the local ballpark known as Soldiers Field on September 26th. The game had an estimated attendance of 12,000 and was won by the Yankees, 8-7.

Police Chief Patrick Foley of Douglas was elected Vice President of the International Association of Chiefs of Police (IACP), at the annual convention in Denver, Colorado, in 2009.

In December 2017, Lt. Nick L. Miglionico was sworn in as the new Chief Of Police replacing longtime Chief Patrick Foley who retired and took a position as Chief of Police in Williston Vt. Chief Miglionico has been with the Douglas Police Department since January 1997.

A common misconception in Douglas is in regard to the New England Trunkline Trail. Many believe that railroad tracks were laid here for commuting from northern Connecticut to northern Massachusetts. In fact, they were used to haul ice from Wallum Lake as interstate commerce. Today you can hike these trails through Massachusetts and Connecticut. The New England Trunkline was originally planned as a railroad, but the financier died in the sinking of the Titanic.

The E. N. Jenckes Store Museum

The E.N. Jenckes store and museum sits on Main Street in the village of East Douglas. Ebenezer Balkcom opened a small store at the corner of Main and Pleasant (now Depot) streets during the 1830s, when East Douglas was becoming the economic center of the town. The store changed hands (sold to Gardner Chase) until he retired and sold the building to Edward L. Jenckes. After Jenckes death in 1924 is daughters E. Mialma and Helen R. continued to run the store until the store closed in 1964. The store remained closed until 1972 when the property was donated to the Douglas Historical Society, where it was carefully restored to its original general store appearance of 100 years ago.

Geography
It includes the Douglas State Forest and is home to Wallum Lake and Whitins Reservoir.

The principal elevations are Bald Hill, Wallum Pond Hill, Mount Ashworth, 713 feet (218 m), and Mount Daniel, .

Education 

Douglas has four public schools for children grades preschool through twelfth grade to attend. Douglas Primary School enrolls 230 students (2016–2017) in grades preschool, Kindergarten, and first grade. Douglas Elementary School enrolls 404 students (2016–2017) in second grade through fifth grade. Douglas Middle School enrolls 360 students (2016–2017) in sixth through eighth grade. Douglas High School enrolls 394 students (2016–2017) in ninth through twelfth grade.

Douglas is also a member of the thirteen towns that make up Blackstone Valley Regional Vocational Technical High School which provides educational opportunities for students grades 9–12 seeking experience and education in a specific career field.

Douglas High School athletics compete as part of the Dual Valley Conference league with Blackstone-Millville Regional High School, Hopedale High School, Nipmuc Regional High School, Sutton High School, and Whitinsville Christian High School.

Neighborhoods
 East Douglas
 Tasseltop

Demographics

As of the census of 2000, there were 7,045 people, 2,476 households, and 1,936 families residing in the town. The racial makeup of the town was 97.36% White, 0.48% African American, 0.13% Native American, 0.64% Asian, 0.07% Pacific Islander, 0.28% from other races, and 1.04% from two or more races. Hispanic or Latino of any race were 0.95% of the population. From 2000 to 2010 there was a population increase of 20.24%.

There were 2,476 households, out of which 43.1% had children under the age of 18 living with them, 66.6% were married couples living together, 8.1% had a female householder with no husband present, and 21.8% were non-families. 17.3% of all households were made up of individuals, and 6.7% had someone living alone who was 65 years of age or older. The average household size was 2.85 and the average family size was 3.23.

In the town, the population was spread out, with 29.6% under the age of 18, 6.1% from 18 to 24, 36.4% from 25 to 44, 20.1% from 45 to 64, and 7.7% who were 65 years of age or older. The median age was 34 years. For every 100 females, there were 100.7 males. For every 100 females age 18 and over, there were 97.7 males.

The median income for a household in the town was $60,529, and the median income for a family was $67,210. Males had a median income of $45,893 versus $31,287 for females. The per capita income for the town was $23,036. About 2.3% of families and 4.6% of the population were below the poverty line, including 4.4% of those under age 18 and 13.0% of those age 65 or over.

Government
The town has an open town meeting form of government. The government broadcasts many of its meetings on the Apple TV platform as well as internet and local cable TV.  State, Federal and county level elected state officials are shown in the infobox.

See also
 Simon Fairfield Public Library
 Old Douglas Center Historic District

References

External links

Douglas official website

 
Towns in Worcester County, Massachusetts
Towns in Massachusetts